Hubert Lavann Bryant (born February 10, 1946) is a former American football wide receiver who played three seasons for the Pittsburgh Steelers in 1970 and the New England Patriots in 1971-1972. He played college football at the University of Minnesota for the Minnesota Golden Gophers football team.

References

1946 births
Living people
American football wide receivers
Pittsburgh Steelers players
Players of American football from Pittsburgh
New England Patriots players
Minnesota Golden Gophers football players